James Smith (7 May 1901 – 20 July 1970) was an Irish Gaelic footballer. His championship career at senior level with the Cavan county team spanned nineteen years from 1918 until 1937.

Honours
Virginia Blues
Cavan Senior Football Championship (1): 1919

Cavan
All-Ireland Senior Football Championship (2): 1933, 1935

References

1901 births
1970 deaths
Cavan inter-county Gaelic footballers
Gaelic football backs
Garda Síochána officers